The Plattsmouth Main Street Historic District, in Plattsmouth, Nebraska, is a historic district which was listed on the National Register of Historic Places in 1985.

It is in the area of Main St. bounded by Avenue A, S. and N. 3rd St., 1st Ave. and S. and N. 7th St. in Plattsmouth.

It includes:

Cass County Courthouse (1892), 4th & Main Streets: brick, three-story  building with a tower at each corner and a central tower . Designed by William Gray.  Separately listed on the National Register.
Excelsior Building (before 1885), 313 Main Street.  Commercial Italianate.

References

External links

Historic districts on the National Register of Historic Places in Nebraska
National Register of Historic Places in Cass County, Nebraska
Italianate architecture in Nebraska
Romanesque Revival architecture in Nebraska
Neoclassical architecture in Nebraska
Buildings and structures completed in 1869